Dave Patten (born March 12, 1988) is an American musician, actor, director, and author from Philadelphia, Pennsylvania, United States.

Early life and education
Patten attended Temple University in Philadelphia, graduating with a degree in film in 2010. While at university, he collaborated with rapper Meek Mill on tracks "Believe Me" and "How Good", also directing some of Mill's music videos. This led Patten to sign with Creative Artists Agency, and subsequently with Meek Mill's record label DreamChasers Records in 2012.

Career
Patten has been signed to Clark Records since 2009, releasing nine studio albums and one live album. Patten has toured America and Canada, currently represented by Neon Entertainment.

Patten's also appeared as an actor in the DreamWorks film Delivery Man (2013). He currently features in the dark comedy "Escorts".

Discography

References

External links
 

1988 births
Living people
American male actors
American pop musicians
American multi-instrumentalists
American male writers
Temple University alumni